Rosario de la Frontera is a city in the center-south of the province of Salta, Argentina. It is located on National Route 9, by the Horcones River.

Climate
Rosario de la Frontera has a dry-winter humid subtropical climate (Köppen Cwa), characterised by very warm and uncomfortably humid summers alongside pleasant to warm, dry winters with cold mornings and occasional frosts.

References

 

Populated places in Salta Province
Populated places established in 1776